Anton "Toni" Allemann (6 January 1936 – 3 August 2008) was a Swiss footballer. He began his career at BSC Young Boys in Berne in 1957 at age 21, where he spent four seasons.

Early life and career 
Allemann came to London in 1959 as part of his training as a watchmaker. FA regulations meant that he could not play for a professional club so he joined Hayes FC making a total of 15 appearances and scoring 4 goals. In 1961, he joined Italian side A.C. Mantova, and later played for PSV Eindhoven in the Netherlands, and 1. FC Nürnberg in Germany, before returning home to Switzerland in 1966 to play for Grasshopper-Club Zürich.

At the international level, Allemann played 27 times for the Swiss national team, and scored nine international goals. He made his national-team debut in a friendly match against Sweden in 1958, and was a member of Switzerland's 1962 FIFA World Cup squad. He played his last international match in June 1966, where he scored the qualification goal but he was omitted from Switzerland's World Cup squad the same year.

Allemann died 3 August 2008, aged 72, after suffering a heart attack.

References

1936 births
2008 deaths
Swiss men's footballers
Switzerland international footballers
1962 FIFA World Cup players
BSC Young Boys players
Grasshopper Club Zürich players
Mantova 1911 players
PSV Eindhoven players
1. FC Nürnberg players
Bundesliga players
Serie A players
Eredivisie players
Swiss expatriate footballers
Swiss expatriate sportspeople in Italy
Expatriate footballers in Italy
Swiss expatriate sportspeople in the Netherlands
Expatriate footballers in the Netherlands
Swiss expatriate sportspeople in Germany
Expatriate footballers in Germany
Association football forwards
People from Solothurn
Sportspeople from the canton of Solothurn